This article lists the winners and nominees for the NAACP Image Award for Outstanding Literary Work – Poetry. This award was first awarded in 2007 and since its conception, Nikki Giovanni holds the record for most wins in this category with three.

Winners and nominees
Winners are listed first and highlighted in bold.

2000s

2010s

2020s

Multiple wins and nominations

Wins
 3 wins
 Nikki Giovanni

Nominations

 4 nominations
 Nikki Giovanni

 3 nominations
 Derek Walcott

 2 nominations
 Camille T. Dungy
 Major Jackson
 Jamaal May
 Carl Phillips

References

NAACP Image Awards
American literary awards